Tranmere Rovers F.C. won the Third Division play-off final in 1990–91. John King's side lost only two of their first twelve games, with Eddie Bishop scoring a hat-trick over Mansfield Town. After a period of inconsistent form, the re-entered the promotion places with six successive wins. They qualified for the play-offs in fifth position after winning four of their last five matches. Tranmere defeated Brentford 3–2, then beat Bolton Wanderers 1–0 after extra time in  the final. They defeated Rotherham United 3–0, Blackpool 2–0, Wigan Athletic 3–0 and Preston North End 4–1 in the Leyland DAF Cup before losing to Birmingham City in the final at Wembley Stadium.

Final league table

References 

 

 

Tranmere Rovers F.C. seasons
Tranmere Rovers